"Wild Child" is a song recorded by Swedish singer Ace Wilder. The song was released as a digital download in Sweden on 26 February 2017 and peaked at number 51 on the Swedish Singles Chart. It took part in Melodifestivalen 2017 and qualified to the final from the first semi-final on 4 February 2017. It placed seventh in the final. It was written by Peter Boström, Thomas G:son, and Ace Wilder.

Track listing

Chart performance

Release history

References

2017 singles
2016 songs
Ace Wilder songs
English-language Swedish songs
Melodifestivalen songs of 2017
Songs written by Peter Boström
Songs written by Thomas G:son
Songs written by Ace Wilder
Swedish pop songs